Kristina Reed is an American film producer, primarily of animated films, especially the ones by DreamWorks Animation and Walt Disney Animation Studios. She won the Academy Award for Best Animated Short Film for both the 2012 short film Paperman and the 2014 short film Feast.

Early life and education
Reed graduated from Polytechnic School in Pasadena, California. She earned a bachelor's degree with honors in Creative Writing from Brown University. She is married to Mack Reed and has 2 children.

Career
Reed is known for her work Paperman (2012), Feast (2014), both were produced by Walt Disney Animation Studios. Feast premiered in front of Big Hero 6 (on which Reed was co-producer) in theaters. She served on the Walt Disney Animation Studios Leadership Team as head of Production, head of Development, then producer/co-producer for these Oscar-winning animated feature and short.

Filmography
Zootopia (2016) - studio leadership (feature film)
Big Hero 6 (2014) - co-producer (feature film)
Feast (2014) - producer (short film)
Frozen (2013) - studio leadership (feature film)
Paperman (2012) - producer (short film)
Tangled Ever After (2012) - studio leadership (short film)
Tangled (2010) - studio leadership (feature film)
The Princess and the Frog (2009) - studio leadership (feature film)
Kung Fu Panda (2008) - associate producer (feature film)
Shrek the Third (2007) - production executive (feature film)
Flushed Away (2006) - production executive (feature film)
Over the Hedge (2006) - production executive (feature film)
Madagascar (2005) - production executive (feature film)
Shark Tale (2004) - production executive (feature film)
Peter Pan (2003) - visual effects producer (feature film)

References

External links

American film producers
Year of birth missing (living people)
Living people
Walt Disney Animation Studios people
Producers who won the Best Animated Short Academy Award
Brown University alumni